Nassarius comptus is a species of sea snail, a marine gastropod mollusc in the family Nassariidae, the Nassa mud snails or dog whelks.

There is one subspecies :  Nassarius comptus polita (Marrat, 1880)

Description
The shell size varies between 15 mm and 24 mm

Distribution
This species occurs in the Red Sea and in the Indian Ocean off the Mascarene Basin and Mauritius and in the Pacific Ocean off Indonesia and Australia (Queensland)

References

 Adams, A. 1852. Catalogue of the species of Nassa, a genus of Gasteropodous Mollusca, belonging to the family Buccinidae, in the Collection of Hugh Cuming, Esq., with the description of some new species. Proceedings of the Zoological Society of London 1851(19): 94–112
 Marrat, F.P. 1880. On the varieties of the shells belonging to the genus Nassa Lam. 104 pp.
 Schepman, M.M. 1911. The Prosobranchia of the Siboga Expedition. Part 4: Rhachiglossa. pp. 247–364, pls 18–24 in Weber, M. (ed.). Siboga Expeditie. Monograph 49. 
 Kuroda, T. 1929. Notes and descriptions of some new and noteworthy species from Tateyama Bay in the Report of M.T. Fujita. Venus 1(3): 93–97 
 Habe, T. 1961. Coloured illustrations of shells of Japan. Osaka, Japan : Hoikusha 82 pp., 66 pls. 
 Cernohorsky, W.O. 1984. Systematics of the family Nassariidae (Mollusca: Gastropoda). Bulletin of the Auckland Institute and Museum. Auckland, New Zealand 14: 1–356 
 Vine, P. (1986). Red Sea Invertebrates. Immel Publishing, London. 224 pp.
 Drivas, J. & M. Jay (1988). Coquillages de La Réunion et de l'île Maurice
 Michel, C. (1988). Marine molluscs of Mauritius. Editions de l'Ocean Indien. Stanley, Rose Hill. Mauritius
 Wilson, B. 1994. Australian Marine Shells. Prosobranch Gastropods. Kallaroo, WA : Odyssey Publishing Vol. 2 370 pp.

External links
 

Nassariidae
Gastropods described in 1856